Perry Williams may refer to:

Perry Williams (cornerback), American football cornerback
Perry Williams (running back), American football running back